Breightmet  is a neighbourhood of Bolton, in Greater Manchester, England. The population of the ward taken at the 2011 census was 13,584.

History

Toponymy
The name is from Old English breorht (bright) and maed (meadow). It was recorded variously as Brihtmede (1257), Brightemete (1277), Breghmete and Breghtmed (1292), Brithmete (1302), Brightmede (1510) and Breightmet (1574).

Manor
The manor originated as part of the Marsey fee and one ploughland was held by Augustin de Breightmet in the 12th century. By marriage, one part descended to the Southworths of Samlesbury, who held it until the 16th century. This portion was later owned by Gerards, Ainsworths, Banastres, Baguley and Parker families. The other part was held by the Hollands until they forfeited it in 1461, when it was granted to Lord Stanley and his son, Lord Strange, the Earls of Derby.

Industry
There were handloom weavers producing quilts and counterpanes. Two cotton mills and a bleachworks were built.

Governance
In 1837 Breightmet became part of the Bolton Poor Law Union, which took responsibility for funding the Poor Law in that area. The township was incorporated in the borough of Bolton in 1898. Following the Local Government Act 1972, the County Borough of Bolton was abolished and Breightmet became part of the Metropolitan Borough of Bolton in Greater Manchester in 1974. It is represented by three councillors on Bolton Council and is part of the Bolton North-East Westminster constituency.

Geography
The Breightmet township, which covered  acres of hilly land was two miles north east of Bolton on Bury road. It was separated from Tonge with Haulgh by the Bradshaw Brook.
There is a local nature reserve at Seven Acres Country Park. The park separates the west side of Breightmet from neighbouring Tonge Moor.

Economy and facilities
The main shopping area within Breightmet is along the A58 Bury Road. It has a Morrisons store, formerly Netto, which was acquired from Asda in Jan 2011, and a Home Bargains. There is a Breightmet Health Centre which includes GP surgeries, a library and pharmacy. In 2016 a retail park was built on the site of the former Mecca Bingo hall, and includes an Iceland, Greenhalghs bakery, Card Factory, Aldi and Barnardo's charity shop. As of July 2018 two units remain empty: one which has never been occupied and one, formally Poundworld, which closed in July 2018. In 2019 B & M bargains replaced it.

Religion
There are several places of worship in Breightmet including  two Anglican churches, St James and St John the Evangelist, St Osmund's Roman Catholic church, Red Lane United Reformed Church and the independent Kings Church Bolton, Unit 1, Millfield Rd, Boundary Industrial Estate.

St James' parish church designed by John Edgar Gregan was consecrated in 1855. Canon James Slade, Vicar of Bolton from 1817 to 1856, and founder of the Bolton Church Institute is buried in the churchyard.

Sport and leisure
Bolton St Catherine's Academy has a community leisure and sports centre. Leverhulme Park, the largest park area within Bolton has a community and children's centre with therapy suites, gymnasium, indoor athletics hall and outdoor athletics stadium, which  hosts the town's school athletics competitions. The park has football pitches, 5-a-side football pitches, bowling greens and an athletics stadium as well as nature walks and picnic areas. The park is also home to the Bolton Parkrun.

Education
Bolton St Catherine's Academy caters for children from three to 19. It is a Church of England school incorporating the former Withins School, a secondary school and Top o'th Brow Primary School.

Four other primary schools serve Breightmet. These are Red Lane County Primary School, Leverhulme Community Primary School, Blackshaw County Primary School, and St. Osmund and Andrew Roman Catholic County Primary School.

Notable residents
Badly Drawn Boy (real name Damon Gough), indie singer-songwriter, grew up in Breightmet.

References

External links
 Photos and information about Breightmet
 GENUKI: Breightmet, Lancashire genealogy
 St James parish church
 Breightmet graves

Areas of Bolton
History of Bolton